The Oyodogawa Dams are two dams as part of a hydroelectric power station in Miyazaki Prefecture, Japan.  The first was completed in 1961.

References

Dams in Miyazaki Prefecture
Hydroelectric power stations in Japan
Dams completed in 1961